The 2015 Aegon Surbiton Trophy was a professional tennis tournament played on outdoor grass courts. It was the twelfth edition for the men and thirteenth edition for the women of the tournament and part of the 2015 ATP Challenger Tour and 2015 ITF Women's Circuit, offering a total of €42,500 (ATP) and $50,000 (ITF) in prize money. It took place in Surbiton, United Kingdom, on 8–14 June 2015.

Men's singles main draw entrants

Seeds 

 1 Rankings as of 25 May 2015

Other entrants 
The following players received wildcards into the singles main draw:
  Edward Corrie
  Daniel Cox
  Joshua Milton
  David Rice

The following player gain entry as special exempt into the singles main draw:
  Luke Saville
  Connor Smith

The following players received entry from the qualifying draw:
  Alex Bolt
  Dimitar Kutrovsky
  Frederik Nielsen
  Daniel Smethurst

Women's singles main draw entrants

Seeds 

 1 Rankings as of 25 May 2015

Other entrants 
The following players received wildcards into the singles main draw:
  Georgina Axon
  Laura Deigman
  Francesca Stephenson
  Gabriella Taylor

The following players received entry from the qualifying draw:
  Naiktha Bains
  Jazzamay Drew
  Lucy Brown
  Luisa Stefani

The following player received entry by a protected ranking:
  Mihaela Buzărnescu

Men's doubles main draw entrants

Seeds

1 Rankings as of May 25, 2015.

Other entrants
The following pairs received wildcards into the doubles main draw:
  Luke Bambridge /  Liam Broady
  Sean Thornley /  Darren Walsh

The following pairs gained entry into the doubles main draw as an alternate:
  Hiroki Moriya /  Zhang Ze

Champions

Men's singles

 Matthew Ebden def.  Denis Kudla 6–7(4–7), 6–4, 7–6(7–5)

Women's singles

 Vitalia Diatchenko def.  Naomi Osaka, 7–6(7–5), 6–0

Men's doubles

 Ken Skupski  /  Neal Skupski def.  Marcus Daniell /  Marcelo Demoliner 6–3, 6–4

Women's doubles

 Lyudmyla Kichenok /  Xenia Knoll def.  Tara Moore /  Nicola Slater, 7–6(8–6), 6–3

External links 
 2015 Aegon Surbiton Trophy at ITFtennis.com
 Official website

2015 ITF Women's Circuit
2015 ATP Challenger Tour
2015
2015 in British sport
June 2015 sports events in the United Kingdom